Priam, Priamus, or Priamos is a non-Greek name of a legendary king of Troy, probably of Luwian origin. It may also refer to:

Priam Corporation, a hard disk manufacturer between 1978 and 1989
Priam Systems Corporation, a hard disk manufacturing company between 1990 and 1991
Priam (horse), a Thoroughbred racehorse
Priamus (journal), a journal
Priam, Minnesota, an unincorporated community
PRIAM enzyme-specific profiles, a method for the automatic detection of likely enzymes in protein sequences
Mount Priam, a mountain of the Trojan Range in Antarctica
Priam, a misname of Trenton, Indiana